The Hurricane Frances tornado outbreak was a widespread tornado outbreak associated with Hurricane Frances that came ashore on eastern Florida on September 4–5, 2004. Outer bands from the hurricane and its remnants, when it moved across the Appalachian Mountains, produced one of the largest tornado outbreaks ever spawned by a tropical cyclone in the United States in terms of number of tornadoes confirmed since records were kept in 1950. In addition, it was the largest tornado outbreak in South Carolina history, with nearly half of the tornadoes in that state.

At least 103 tornadoes were confirmed from September 4 to September 8 across the Southeast and Middle Atlantic States. However, Hurricane Beulah in 1967 and Hurricane Ivan, which affected western Florida less than two weeks after Frances, produced more tornadoes. Other tornadoes from a separate system were spawned in Iowa and Minnesota on September 5. Most of the tornadoes were weak F0's and F1's but a few strong tornadoes were produced across the Carolinas. In particular, an F3 affected areas near Camden, South Carolina producing extensive damage.

While the hurricane itself killed 49 including seven attributed directly to the storm, the tornadoes associated with Frances did not produce any direct fatalities. However, 13 people were injured in South Carolina by the storm including five from an F2 in Chesterfield County three others in Sumter County, three in the Gadsden area in Richland County, one near Camden in Kershaw County and one in Jasper County.

Background
Frances began as a tropical depression west-southwest of Cabo Verde on August 25 from a vigorous tropical wave that departed the coastline of Africa several days prior. As the system moved generally west-northwest, it grew steadily in strength, first to tropical storm strength later on August 25, and then hurricane intensity the next afternoon. After attaining its peak strength as a Category 4 hurricane while north of Puerto Rico, Frances made two landfalls as a major hurricane on San Salvador Island and subsequently Cat Island, in addition to two additional landfalls at Category 2 intensity on Eleuthera Island and Grand Bahama Island. High pressure built north of the cyclone by September 4, causing Frances to turn west and make landfall over the southern end of Hutchinson Island, Florida, with winds of 105 mph (165 km/h) early on September 5. The system weakened over the state, briefly emerging into the northeastern Gulf of Mexico before making a final landfall at the mouth of the Aucilla River in Florida on the afternoon of September 6, with winds of 60 mph (95 km/h). Frances continued inland, ultimately dissipating over the Gulf of St. Lawrence late on September 10. Along its path, the storm accrued over $9 billion (2004 USD) in damage and resulted in 50 deaths.

The brunt of tornadic activity associated with Frances occurred on September 5 through September 8 as the system progressed northward across the East Coast of the United States. An attendant frontal boundary, originally positioned offshore on September 5, lifted northward across the region over subsequent days. Along the east-to-west-oriented boundary, low to moderate convective available potential energy, plentiful moisture, and strong low-level wind shear culminated in the development of several long-lived supercell thunderstorms within the outer rainbands of Frances. Like in most hurricanes, the concentration of rotating storms was focused well northeast of the storm's center. These supercells resulted in numerous tornadoes, including 45 in South Carolina on September 7 alone, setting a new daily record in the state previously held by 1994's Tropical Storm Beryl. Frances also spawned 14 tornadoes in Virginia, tying Hurricane Gaston from the same year as the fifth-most-prolific producer in the state. Overall, 106 tornadoes were confirmed in association with Frances, surpassed only by 127 with Hurricane Ivan and 115 associated with Hurricane Beulah.

Tornado table

Confirmed tornadoes

September 4 event

September 5 event

September 6 event

September 7 event

September 8 event

See also 
 Tornadoes of 2004
 List of North American tornadoes and tornado outbreaks
 List of North American tornadoes and tornado outbreaks
 List of tropical cyclone-spawned tornadoes

References

External links
 NWS Wilmington page of the Hurricane Frances Tornado Outbreak in southern South Carolina

Tornadoes of 2004
F3 tornadoes
Tornadoes in Florida
Tornadoes in North Carolina
Tornadoes in South Carolina
Tornadoes in Virginia
September 2004 events in the United States